The South Lafourche Bridge crosses Bayou Lafourche at Louisiana Highway 3162 and East 90th Street in the town of Galliano, Louisiana.  Built in 1972, this vertical-lift bridge has a total length of 253.8 feet with its largest span at 104 feet.  The bridge deck is 27.8 feet wide, and there is a vertical clearance above the deck of 17.4 feet.

References

Road bridges in Louisiana
Vertical lift bridges in Louisiana
Buildings and structures in Lafourche Parish, Louisiana